The 2006 National Camogie League is a competition in the women's team field sport of camogie was won by Cork, who defeated Tipperary in the final, played at Thurles.

The Final
The final was played immediately after the Munster hurling championship match between Tipperary and Limerick. Cork settled well despite having to wait 12 minutes for their opening score. Tipperary got the better start with a Claire Grogan free after just a minute and a half. It took Cork another 10 minutes to open the scoring, when Jennifer O'Leary sent over the first of her four frees. An Emily Hayden goal gave Tipperary a 2-2 to 0-5 half time lead. Emer Dillon scored a Cork goal on the restart to level the scores and from then on Cork were in full control.

Division 2
The Division 2 final, known until 2005 as the National Junior League, was won by Kilkenny intermediates who defeated Dublin in the final. The Division 3 final was won by Clare who defeated Derry in the final.

Final stages

References

External links
 Camogie Association

National Camogie League
2006